Delitto sull'autostrada (Crime on the Highway) is a 1982 Italian "poliziottesco"-comedy film directed by Bruno Corbucci. It is the ninth  chapter in the Nico Giraldi film series starring Tomas Milian.

Plot
Rome, Italy early 1980s. Nico Giraldi (Tomas Milian) is transformed after many other adventures, in a trucker to sneak in a band that performs raids at the expense of TIR.

Cast 
 Tomas Milian as Nico Giraldi
 Viola Valentino as Anna Danti
 Bombolo as Venticello
 Olimpia Di Nardo as  Angela
 Paco Fabrini as  Rocky Giraldi
 Marcello Martana as  Commissioner Trentini
 Tony Kendall as  Tarquini
 Gabriella Giorgelli as  Bocconotti Cinzia
 Giorgio Trestini as  Andrea Carboni
 Adriana Russo as  Miss Carboni
Marina Hedman as  Woman at the confessional
 Ennio Antonelli as  Trainer  
 Enzo Andronico as  Receiver of stolen goods
 Andrea Aureli as  Mr. Mariotti

See also
 List of Italian films of 1982

References

External links

1982 films
Films directed by Bruno Corbucci
Italian crime comedy films
Poliziotteschi films
Films set in Rome
Films scored by Franco Micalizzi
1980s crime comedy films
1982 comedy films
1980s Italian-language films
1980s Italian films